Alberto Benettin (born Padova, 25 November 1990) is an Italian rugby union player. He plays as a fly-half. He currently plays for Zebre in the Pro14.

Benettin made his debut for Italian national rugby union team against Canada on 15 June 2012.

References

External links
 http://www.scoresway.com/?sport=rugby&page=player&id=3
 http://www.itsrugby.co.uk/player-international-16256.html

1990 births
Living people
Italian rugby union players
Italy international rugby union players
Zebre Parma players
Rugby union fly-halves